Thiri Zeya Thura was governor of Pakhan from 1426 to 1429. A younger brother of Queen Shin Myat Hla of Ava, he was posted at Pakhan in August 1426 by his brother-in-law King Mohnyin Thado. He was the father of Queen Min Hla Nyet of Ava.

Ancestry
The following is his older sister Queen Shin Myat Hla's ancestry as given in the Hmannan Yazawin chronicle. His father was governor of Taungdwin from the 1360s to at least until 1402.

Notes

References

Bibliography

 
 
 

Ava dynasty
1380s births
1429 deaths
Year of birth uncertain